SAfm is a national, English-language public radio station in South Africa. It has been operated by the South African Broadcasting Corporation (SABC) since its founding in 1936.

History
SAfm was the SABC's first radio station, and the country's first public radio station. From 1924 to 1936, the only radio service in South Africa was a privately owned station called JB, which broadcast to the cities of Johannesburg, Durban, and (later) Cape Town. An Act of Parliament in 1936 made official the conversion of JB into a public broadcaster.

In its early days as a public radio service, the station was called the "A" Programme. When the SABC started an Afrikaans-language station in 1937, the two stations came to be called the English Service and the Afrikaans Service, respectively. In 1985 the English Service was renamed Radio South Africa; it has had its current name, SAfm, since 1995. The SAfm studio is now in SABC Radio Park, in the Johannesburg suburb of Auckland Park.

Programming
From 1995 to 2003, it gradually reduced the scope of its programming from a general, multi-genre format to a news and talk radio format. In 2006, the Independent Communications Authority of South Africa required SAfm to re-add drama and children's radio programmes, and these are now among the station's offerings. In 2012, SAfm was broadcasting 24 hours per day.

Audience figures
Most SAfm listeners are in age range of 35 to 49, and LSM groups 7–10.

See also

 Channel Africa
 List of radio stations in South Africa
 Springbok Radio

References

External links
 

Radio stations in South Africa
Radio stations established in 1936